CP-132,484 is a tryptamine derivative which acts as a potent and selective agonist for the 5-HT2 family of serotonin receptors. It has reasonable selectivity for 5-HT2A and 5-HT2C subtypes over 5-HT2B, but is only slightly selective for 5-HT2A over 5-HT2C. This compound and several related analogues have been shown to have ocular hypotensive activity in animal models, suggesting they may be useful for the treatment of glaucoma.

See also
 AL-37350A
 AL-38022A
 1-Methylpsilocin
 4,5-DHP-DMT

References 

Dihydropyrans
Serotonin receptor agonists
Tryptamines
Heterocyclic compounds with 3 rings